Blessed & Possessed is the sixth studio album by German power metal band Powerwolf, released on 17 July 2015 by Napalm Records. The band wrote it during 2014 and began recording it in January 2015 at the Studio Fredman in Gothenburg, Sweden, and was produced by Fredrik Nordström. It was mastered in the Fascination Street Studios by Jens Bogren.

Boxset and Earbook Edition of the album features a bonus CD Metallum Nostrum, which contains 10 songs of different artists that Powerwolf's band members selected to cover. It was re-released separately on 11 January 2019.

Background 
Powerwolf began writing their sixth album in June 2014. They finished in the December of the same year. They announced their new album on their Facebook page on 5 December 2014.

They began recording the album in January 2015 at the Studio Fredman in Gothenburg, and the process lasted until March of the same year. They unveiled album's title and the cover art on 18 March 2015. The guitarist Matthew Greywolf stated about the group's new material:

Before the album was released, the group released two singles, "Army of the Night" and "Armata Strigoi". Both of them were first released only in digital form.

Critical reception 
The album was rated positively by the critics. Metal.de wrote: "Blessed & Possessed is already the metal party disc of the year! With powerful riffing, big hooks and the darling dose of kitsch Powerwolf once again created an album in which every song is really a hit!". Metal Hammer saw the song "Higher Than Heaven" as the "highlight of the album".

Track listing 

Boxset & Earbook edition contain a bonus CD, Metallum Nostrum, which was not released separately until 11 January 2019.

Personnel 

Powerwolf
Attila Dorn – vocals
Matthew Greywolf – lead and rhythm guitar
Charles Greywolf – bass, rhythm guitar
Roel van Helden – drums, percussion
Falk Maria Schlegel – organ, keyboards

Additional musicians
Helen Vogt – vocals (choir)
Almut Hellwig – vocals (choir)
Jennifer Gräßer – vocals (choir)
Julia Sharon Harz – vocals (choir)
Anne Diemer – vocals (choir)
Christoph Höbel – vocals (choir)
Torsten Peeß – vocals (choir)
Patrick Staub – vocals (choir)
Francesco Cottone – vocals (choir)
Frank Beck – vocals (choir)
Dirk Reichel – vocals (choir)
Titan Fox – vocals (choir)
Björn Hacket – vocals (choir)
Tobias Engel – vocals (choir)
Michael Morschett – vocals (choir)
Alex Handorf – vocals (choir)
Dirk Bersweiler – vocals (choir)
James Boyle – vocals (choir)
Tom Kurt Germann – vocals (choir)
Daniel Gene Herzmann – vocals (choir)
Toni Hilbert – vocals (choir)

Technical personnel
Jens Bogren– mastering
Sam Braun – editing, recording
David Buballa – editing, recording
Charles Greywolf – engineer
Kristian Kohlmannslehner – engineer
Fredrik Nordström – mixer
Henrik Udd – mixer

Other personnel
Manuela Meyer – photography
Matthew Greywolf – artwork, layout

Charts

Sales and certifications

Release history

References 

Powerwolf albums
2015 albums